The 2001 AFL draft consisted of a state draft, a body draft, a pre-season draft and a trade period.  The AFL draft is the annual draft of players by Australian rules football teams that participate in the main competition of that sport, the Australian Football League (AFL).

In 2001 there were 83 picks to be drafted between 16 teams in the national draft. The Fremantle Dockers originally received the first pick in the national draft after finishing on the bottom of the ladder in the 2001 AFL season but they traded it to Hawthorn for Trent Croad. The No.1 draft pick was Luke Hodge, who became the first No.1 draft pick in many seasons to play in a premiership side.

The draft is known widely as the "superdraft" due to the recruitment of modern star players such as Luke Hodge, Luke Ball, Chris Judd, Jimmy Bartel, Nick Dal Santo, Steve Johnson, Sam Mitchell, Leigh Montagna, Gary Ablett, Brian Lake, Matthew Boyd, James Kelly, Dane Swan, Lewis Roberts-Thomson and David Hale. All of the aforementioned players have played in at least one Grand Final, all but Dal Santo and Montagna have played in a premiership team and Judd, Mitchell and Hodge (three times) have captained their respective teams to victories in the 2006, 2008, 2013, 2014 and 2015 grand finals. Judd (2004, 2010), Bartel (2007), Ablett (2009, 2013), Swan (2011) and Mitchell (2012) have also won the Brownlow Medal, the award for the best and fairest player in a season, while Judd (2005), Johnson (2007), Hodge (2008 and 2014), Bartel (2011) and Lake (2013) have all won a Norm Smith Medal (awarded to the best player on-field in the AFL Grand Final).

Trades
In alphabetical order of new clubs

2001 national draft

Notes

2002 rookie draft

2002 pre-season draft

Honours
Brownlow Medallists:
Chris Judd: 2004 and 2010
Jimmy Bartel: 2007
Gary Ablett, Jr.: 2009 & 2013
Dane Swan: 2011
Sam Mitchell: 2012

Norm Smith Medallists:
Chris Judd: 2005
Steve Johnson: 2007
Luke Hodge: 2008, 2014
Jimmy Bartel: 2011
Brian Lake 2013

Premierships:
Lewis Roberts-Thomson: 2005, 2012
Adam Schneider: 2005
Chris Judd: 2006
Mark Seaby: 2006
Steven Armstrong: 2006
Ashley Hansen: 2006
Quinten Lynch: 2006
Jimmy Bartel: 2007, 2009 and 2011
Luke Hodge: 2008, 2013, 2014, 2015
Rick Ladson: 2008
Campbell Brown: 2008
James Kelly: 2007, 2009 and 2011
Gary Ablett, Jr.: 2007, 2009
Steve Johnson: 2007, 2009 and 2011
Dane Swan: 2010
Luke Ball: 2010
James Podsiadly, 2011
Martin Mattner: 2012
Sam Mitchell: 2008, 2013, 2014, 2015
Brian Lake: 2013, 2014, 2015
David Hale: 2013, 2014, 2015
Matthew Boyd: 2016

References

AFL Draft
Australian Football League draft